Jan Ekels the Younger (1759 Amsterdam - 1793), was a Dutch painter of genre pieces and an imitator of the old masters, especially of J. Molenaer. Two pictures by him, one representing A young Man drawing, and the other A Peasant lighting a Pipe, are in the Städel Gallery at Frankfurt.

References

External links

 Jan Ekels the Younger at PubHist

1759 births
1793 deaths
Dutch genre painters
Painters from Amsterdam
18th-century Dutch painters
18th-century Dutch male artists
Dutch male painters